Marcin Makuch (born 3 April 1980) is a Polish former footballer.

References

1980 births
Footballers from Kraków
Living people
Polish footballers
Association football defenders
Hutnik Nowa Huta players
MKS Cracovia (football) players
Podbeskidzie Bielsko-Biała players
Ruch Chorzów players
Sandecja Nowy Sącz players
Ekstraklasa players
I liga players
II liga players